Chulabhaya was the son of king Amandagamini Abhaya and the ruler of Anuradhapura in the 1st century. He reigned for a short period of time from 33 to 35. He succeeded his uncle Kanirajanu Tissa as King of Anuradhapura and was succeeded by his sister Sivali.

See also
 List of Sri Lankan monarchs
 History of Sri Lanka

References

External links
 Kings & Rulers of Sri Lanka
 Codrington's Short History of Ceylon

Monarchs of Anuradhapura
C
 Sinhalese Buddhist monarchs
C
C